The 2002 PGA Championship was the 84th PGA Championship, held August 15–18 at Hazeltine National Golf Club in Chaska, Minnesota, a suburb southwest of Minneapolis. Rich Beem won his only major title, one stroke ahead of runner-up Tiger Woods.

This was the third major at Hazeltine; it hosted the U.S. Open in 1970 and 1991. The PGA Championship returned seven years later in 2009, also a runner-up finish for Woods.

Course layout 

Source:

Lengths of the course for previous majors:
 , par 72 - 1991 U.S. Open
 , par 72 - 1970 U.S. Open

Round summaries

First round
Thursday, August 15, 2002

Source:

Second round
Friday, August 16, 2002

Source:

Third round
Saturday, August 17, 2002

Source:

Final round
Sunday, August 18, 2002

In a dramatic final round, Woods birdied each of the last four holes to post a 9-under clubhouse score. Beem, in the final group behind Woods, sank a  birdie putt on the 16th hole to maintain a two-shot margin with two holes to play. After a par 3 at the 17th, Beem was on the green at the par-4 18th in two shots. With the luxury of three putts to win the title by one stroke, Beem bogeyed and  Third round leader Justin Leonard shot 77 (+5) to finish six strokes back, in a tie for fourth.

Source:

Scorecard
Final round

Cumulative tournament scores, relative to par

Source:

References

External links
Full results

PGA Championship
Golf in Minnesota
PGA Championship
PGA Championship
PGA Championship
PGA Championship